Sowing the Wind (French:Graine au vent) is a 1929 French silent drama film directed by Maurice Kéroul and Jacques Mills and starring Alexandra, Claudie Lombard and Henri Baudin. It is an adaptation of a novel by Lucie Delarue-Mardrus.

Cast
 Alexandra as Alexandra dite 'Graine au vent'  
 Claudie Lombard as Fernande  
 Henri Baudin as Bruno Horp  
 Céline James as Maman Germaine Horp 
 Marcel Marfu as Un garde-chasse  
 Pierre Casa as Un garde-chasse 
 Mathilde Alberti as Madame Lebigle
 André Deed 
 Vaslin

See akso
Sowing the Wind a 1944 film based on the same novel

References

Bibliography

External links

1929 films
1929 drama films
French drama films
French silent films
1920s French-language films
Films based on French novels
French black-and-white films
Silent drama films
1920s French films